In the Roman Republic, the paedagogus, plural paedagogi or paedagogiani, was a slave or a freedman who taught the sons of Roman citizens the Greek language. In the period of the Roman Empire, the paedagogus became the director of the paedagogium.

In the early Republic, there were no public schools, so boys were taught to read and write by their parents, or by educated slaves (paedagogi) usually of Greek origin.

A representation of a paedagogus was painted as a graffito on the walls of the Palatine Paedagogium, and it represents his social and cultural formation, which is identified such a slave.

In an inscription of the second century dedicated to the Roman emperor Caracalla, it lists twenty-four paedagogi. In some cases, the title of paedagogus is connected with private elite families.

Being a paedagogus meant to obey conduct and duty laws. In the imperial institution, the title of paedagogus refers to the duty of child-attendant or tutor rather than a teacher. The other title of paedagogus refers to a variety of interrelated capacities related to the offspring of the imperial family and aristocracy: disciplina (academic and moral instruction), custodia (companion and protector) and decorum (directives of precepts for public behaviour). There is a third title which appears in three inscriptions and means the director of the paedagogium (praeceptor).

In other texts and graphics, slaves are divided depending on their membership of a larger servile environment (paedagogium), freedpersons (paedagogi, paedagogiani, custodes and procuratores) and a community of persons (pueri, iuvenes, vernae domini nostri).

References

Bibliography

External links 

Obsolete occupations
Slavery in ancient Rome
Teaching
Ancient Roman occupations